Garage at Night is a Canadian short drama film, directed by Daniel Daigle and released in 2017. The film stars Guillaume Laurin, Ève Lemieux, Stéphane Messier and Antoine Pilon, and centres on two brothers.

The film won the Prix Télé-Québec for best short film at the Abitibi-Témiscamingue International Film Festival.

At the 6th Canadian Screen Awards in 2018, the film was shortlisted for Best Live Action Short Drama.

References

External links 
 

2017 short films
2017 drama films
French-language Canadian films
Canadian drama short films
2010s Canadian films